Choroedocus is a genus of grasshoppers in the subfamily Catantopinae, not assigned to any tribe.  Species can be found in South Africa, India and Indo-China.

Species
The Orthoptera Species File lists:
 Choroedocus capensis (Thunberg, 1815) - type species (as Gryllus capensis Thunberg)
 Choroedocus illustris (Walker, 1870)
 Choroedocus pallens Uvarov, 1933
 Choroedocus robustus (Serville, 1838)
 Choroedocus sparsus (Serville, 1838)
 Choroedocus violaceipes Miller, 1934

References

External links 
 

Acrididae genera
Catantopinae
Orthoptera of Asia
Orthoptera of Africa
Orthoptera of Indo-China